Rex Wayne Scouten (September 16, 1924 – February 20, 2013) was the White House Chief Usher from 1969 to 1986, and White House Curator from 1986 to 1997.

Born in Snover, Michigan, Scouten served in the United States Army during World War II. He graduated from Michigan State University. From 1949 to 1960, he served in the United States Secret Service.  As such he served as Secret Service protection for Vice President Nixon from 1953 through 1957, and then worked at the White House.  From 1960 to 1969, he was an assistant White House usher. Scouten was the White House Chief Usher from March 1969 to January 1986, and the White House Curator from 1986 to 1997.

He died in Fairfax, Virginia on February 20, 2013, survived by his wife, Dorothy (married 1947), and two daughters.

Notes

External links

1924 births
2013 deaths
Michigan State University alumni
White House Chief Ushers
United States Secret Service agents
White House Curators
People from Sanilac County, Michigan
Reagan administration personnel
George H. W. Bush administration personnel
Clinton administration personnel
George W. Bush administration personnel
Nixon administration personnel
Ford administration personnel
Carter administration personnel
Military personnel from Michigan
United States Army personnel of World War II